Estelle Gettleman (née Scher; July 25, 1923 – July 22, 2008), known professionally as Estelle Getty, was an American 
actress and comedian best known for her portrayal of Sophia Petrillo on The Golden Girls (1985–92), for which she won a Golden Globe Award for Best Actress – Television Series Musical or Comedy and a Primetime Emmy Award for Outstanding Supporting Actress in a Comedy Series. She reprised the role for appearances on Empty Nest (1993–95), The Golden Palace (1992–93), Blossom (1990–95), and Nurses (1991–94). Notable films in which she appeared include Mask (1985), a semibiographical film in which she played the grandmother of Roy L. Dennis, Mannequin (1987), and Stuart Little (1999). She retired from acting in 2001 due to failing health, and died in 2008 from dementia with Lewy bodies.

Early life
Getty was born Estelle Scher in New York City on July 25, 1923, to Charles Scher and Sarah (née Lacher), Jewish immigrants from Poland, at the family's apartment at 257 East 2nd Street on the Lower East Side, which also served as the storefront for the family's glass business. She had a sister Rosilyn "Roz" Scher Howard, and a brother Samuel "David" Scher. As a child, she was known as Etty, a nickname that stemmed from her sister's inability to pronounce "Estelle" correctly, and it stuck with her throughout her life. Her father owned and operated his own business, installing glass windows into automobiles and trucks, and her mother was a homemaker. As a weekly treat, every Friday night, her father would take their family to the Academy of Music on 14th Street to watch a film and a live vaudeville performance, and while watching those performances, Getty decided she wanted to become an actor.

After graduating from Seward Park High School, she continued to live at home with her parents, her father doubtful she would be able to forge a successful career in acting, and worked as a secretary, as the hours allowed for her to attend auditions in the late afternoon and evening while having an income.

Career
For years, Getty won roles in the New York theater circuit, while simultaneously holding a job and raising her two sons, but she struggled to gain notice for her talent. Finally, in 1982, nearing 60 years old, she found her breakthrough role as Mrs. Beckoff in the Broadway production Torch Song Trilogy, a character that playwright Harvey Fierstein had created specifically with her in mind. She received widespread praise for her appearance in the play—including a Drama Desk Award nomination—and went on to reprise the role in both Broadway and off-Broadway productions for four years. In 1985, the role heavily influenced Witt/Thomas/Harris Productions to cast Getty for the role of Sophia Petrillo on NBC's new sitcom, The Golden Girls. Getty relied on wigs, clothing, and heavy makeup to age herself to look the part of a mother in her 80s. In reality, she was a year younger than her television daughter, Bea Arthur, who played Dorothy Zbornak. In 1988, Getty won her most notable award, the Primetime Emmy Award for Outstanding Supporting Actress in a Comedy Series, for her work on the show.

The Golden Girls ended in 1992 after seven seasons (six of the seven seasons in the top 10 of the Nielsen ratings) due to Arthur wishing to explore new projects. That fall, Getty, McClanahan, and White starred in the show's spin-off, The Golden Palace, for one season before its cancellation. Getty then appeared in Empty Nest, Nurses, Blossom, Touched by an Angel, Mad About You, and The Nanny. Her other television and film appearances prior to and during the filming of The Golden Girls included the TV series Fantasy Island and Cagney & Lacey, and the films Tootsie and Mask, and a starring role in Stop! Or My Mom Will Shoot.

During her time on The Golden Girls, Getty wrote her autobiography, If I Knew Then, What I Know Now... So What?, with the help of Steve Delsohn, published by Contemporary Books in 1988. She also released an exercise video for senior citizens in 1993.

Personal life

Family
Getty was introduced to Arthur Gettleman, whose last name she later used as the basis for her stage name, at a party by her friends from the New York theater circuit. The two married nine months later on December 21, 1947. They had two children together, sons Carl Gettleman and Barry Gettleman, and remained married until his death on September 24, 2004, at the age of 85. After they wed, the two lived in the Bronx for a time, and, after the births of their two sons, moved to Oakland Gardens, Queens, living in a liberal-minded cooperative built for Jewish veterans of World War II called Bell Park Gardens, while Arthur worked with his father-in-law in glass installation. The two lived separately for some time in the mid-80s to mid-90s, as Getty moved to California to work on The Golden Girls, and Arthur had no desire to leave New York, and continued to work in the family's glass business.

HIV/AIDS activism
Getty was said by friends Harvey Fierstein and Rosie O'Donnell, both notable members of the LGBT community, to have been heavily involved in HIV/AIDS activism and had lost close friends and family to the disease, among them her nephew Steven Scher (1962–1992), whom she cared for after he was diagnosed with HIV/AIDS, and her Torch Song Trilogy co-star Court Miller (1952–1986). She later helped to open a hospice for AIDS patients in Greensboro, North Carolina, her nephew's hometown, in 1996, called Beacon Place, which was still in operation as of 2021.

Death
Getty died in the early morning hours of July 22, 2008, aged 84, at her home in Los Angeles, the result of Lewy Body Dementia, according to her family. She was buried in Hollywood Forever Cemetery, her headstone inscribed with the words "With Love and Laughter" and a Star of David to indicate her Jewish faith. Bea Arthur, Betty White, and Rue McClanahan, her co-stars from The Golden Girls were saddened by her loss and, in an interview, said that her disease had progressed to the point where she was not able to hold conversations with them or recognize them. She had reportedly started to show signs of dementia during the filming of the television series, when, despite more than three decades of theater work, she began to struggle to remember her lines, and in later seasons of the show, had to rely on cue cards. Getty suffered from osteoporosis, and was also thought to have Parkinson's disease. This diagnosis was ultimately changed to dementia with Lewy bodies.

According to her former co-star White, Getty had undergone a facelift sometime during the hiatus between the end of filming season one of The Golden Girls and the beginning of filming season two. Getty had a strong fear of death, to the point where she avoided making jokes about death whenever possible, and was uncomfortable when the show brought up the subject.

Filmography

Television

Live theater

References

External links
 
 

1923 births
2008 deaths
20th-century American actresses
21st-century American actresses
20th-century American comedians
Jewish American female comedians
American television actresses
American stage actresses
American film actresses
American people of Polish-Jewish descent
Best Musical or Comedy Actress Golden Globe (television) winners
Jewish American actresses
American LGBT rights activists
Actresses from New York City
Actresses from Los Angeles
Burials at Hollywood Forever Cemetery
American women comedians
Deaths from Lewy body dementia
Deaths from dementia in California
Outstanding Performance by a Supporting Actress in a Comedy Series Primetime Emmy Award winners
Yiddish theatre performers
Activists from New York City
Comedians from California
Comedians from New York City
Activists from California
Seward Park High School alumni
20th-century American Jews
21st-century American Jews